Frankie Adams (born 3 January 1994) is a Samoan New Zealand actress, best known for her roles as Bobbie Draper in the science fiction television series The Expanse and as Ula Levi in the prime-time soap opera Shortland Street.

Early life
Adams was born on the island of Savaii in Samoa and is the oldest of three daughters. She attended Auckland Girls Grammar School.

Career
Adams's first role, aged 16, was that of Ula Levi in the soap opera Shortland Street. She has also had roles in  the television series Wentworth and in the film One Thousand Ropes.

In 2016, she was cast as "Martian Marine Corps gunnery sergeant" Bobbie Draper as part of the main cast in the second season of the U.S. sci-fi television series The Expanse, a role she has continued through the sixth and final season.

Celebrity boxing
Adams has participated in a celebrity Fight for Life charity boxing event, trained by Lolo Heimuli. She lost the celebrity exhibition match by a clear decision.

Filmography

Film

Television

References

External links
 

1994 births
Living people
New Zealand people of Samoan descent
New Zealand television actresses
New Zealand soap opera actresses
Actresses of Samoan descent
Fighters trained by Lolo Heimuli
People educated at Auckland Girls' Grammar School
21st-century New Zealand actresses